Buck Buckley is the Co-Founder and CIO of Semcap and CEO of Actua Corporation, formerly ICG Corporation, a company that he co-founded along with Ken Fox. In 2017, the company announced the sale of its majority-owned assets and that it would return 3x capital to shareholders.

Early life and education
Buckley grew up in Devon, Pennsylvania and attended Episcopal Academy through high school. He then attended University of North Carolina at Chapel Hill, graduating with a Bachelor of Arts in political science. While in college, Buckley starred on the North Carolina soccer team. He was First Team all ACC and All South for UNC. His coach, legendary Anson Dorrance recalled "He played with wonderful, physical, reckless abandon", leaving it all on the field.

Currently
Buckley and Cyrus Vandrevala co-founded Semcap [] in 2020. a growth impact manager investing in companies at the forefront of seminal trends in three sectors-Healthcare, Education and Food & Nutrition. The company has made seven investments, including NeuroFlow, SafeRide Health,Purely Elizabeth and Good Culture. Semcap will be launching a fund this year.

Earlier in his career
In 1988, Buckley joined Safeguard Scientifics, a venture capital firm. From 1991 to 1996, Buckley was the Vice President of Acquisitions at Safeguard. There, he oversaw the acquisitions of a number of companies including ChromoVision, Diamond Technology, Video Server, and XL Vision.

Internet Capital Group
Buckley and fellow Safeguard executive Ken Fox noticed an emerging market in e-commerce business-to-business and left Safeguard in February 1996 to found a venture capital firm, Internet Capital Group (later shortened to ICG). They asked Safeguard head Pete Musser for $5 million in funding, but he insisted on investing $15 million. Buckley and Fox raised $40 million to start ICG, twice what they wanted. In addition to Safeguard, major investors included Comcast, Compaq, and BancBoston Ventures.

Buckley served as the CEO and president of the company from March 1996 to December 2001, at which time he became the company's Chairman, a position he continues to hold. ICG invested $1.4 billion in 61 start-up firms; and an article declared that "Buckley put B2B on the map".

In August 1999, the company became a public company via an initial public offering, offering stock for sale at $12 per share. By December 1999, the stock was trading at over $200 per share and Buckley's stake of 10,000,000 shares, or 3.5% of the company, was worth over $2 billion. By November 2000, the stock was down to $11 per share and after the September 11 attacks it traded for 20 cents per share. Buckley sold very little of his stock and remained optimistic.

After ICG survived the crash, paid down the debt and changed its business model to move towards an operating model. Instead of taking small stakes in many companies, it invested in a few "core" companies at a time, as a majority owner. This allowed the company to have much greater control over the operations of its investments. Buckley refocused the company to find strategic partnerships with traditional industry leaders such as a joint venture with DuPont called CapSpan in early 2000. In September 2014, when the company changed its name to Actua Corporation, its stock was trading around $6 per share and was worth approximately $200 million. At its closing, Actua distributed close to $18/share and provided a triple return to investors.

Other affiliations
Buckley serves on the Board of Directors for Philadelphia based FS Investments, a $34+ billion asset manager. He is a director of several technology startups including Critical Alert, Diagnostic Bio Chips, Dropps [], Margaux and []. He is on the advisory boards of the Carolina Entrepreneurial Initiative, the UNC Kenan–Flagler Business School, and the Vetri Foundation and Starfinder Foundation. Previously, he was a director of Breakaway Solutions, Channel Intelligence, Familywyze, ICG Commerce and VerticalNet .

Buckley is known for a "coach-like style" of management that encourages teamwork and camaraderie.

Recognition
In 2000, Buckley was named the Entrepreneur of the Year by Price Waterhouse, and received the Entrepreneurial Excellence Award from the Greater Philadelphia Venture Group.

Personal life
Buckley is an avid runner, often traversing a long, rocky hill near the Actua headquarters at Valley Forge National Historical Park. Early American History and the founding of the country is an important passion, and Buckley is Executive Producer and Executive Chair of Primary Source Media [], which makes entertainment about history, using primary source materials.Their first property, the 2 Complicated 4 History Podcast, is distributed by Audacy []. 

Buckley has two children, Alexa Buckley, co-founder of women's footwear company Margaux, and Dutch Buckley, co-founder of Happy Being.

References

American chief executives of financial services companies
American venture capitalists
University of North Carolina at Chapel Hill alumni
Date of birth missing (living people)
Living people
Businesspeople from Philadelphia
1960 births